Senator Hogan may refer to:

Charles V. Hogan (1897–1971), Massachusetts State Senate
Daniel Hogan (Illinois politician) (1849–1912), Illinois State Senate
Edward Hogan (Missouri politician) (1885–1963), Missouri State Senate
Edward Hogan (New York politician) (1834–1905), New York State Senate
John Hogan (North Carolina planter) (1740–1810), North Carolina State Senate
Kathy Hogan (born 1948), North Dakota State Senate
Thomas S. Hogan (1869–1957), Montana State Senate